The French–England House is a historic house at 1700 Broadway in Little Rock, Arkansas.  It is a large and elaborately-decorated two story American Foursquare house, with a tall hip roof with flared eaves, narrow weatherboard siding, and a high brick foundation.  A single-story porch extends across much of the front, with Ionic columns and a modillioned and dentillated cornice.  The house was designed by noted Arkansas architect Charles L. Thompson, and was built in 1900.

The house was listed on the U.S. National Register of Historic Places in 1982 for its architecture.

See also
National Register of Historic Places listings in Little Rock, Arkansas

References

Houses on the National Register of Historic Places in Arkansas
Colonial Revival architecture in Arkansas
Houses completed in 1900
Houses in Little Rock, Arkansas
National Register of Historic Places in Little Rock, Arkansas
Historic district contributing properties in Arkansas